This is a list of the number ones of the UK Album Downloads Chart.

List of UK Album Downloads Chart number ones of the 2000s
List of UK Album Downloads Chart number ones of the 2010s
List of UK Album Downloads Chart number ones of the 2020s

See also
 Lists of UK Singles Downloads Chart number ones
 Lists of UK Compilation Chart number ones
 Lists of UK Dance Albums Chart number ones
 Lists of UK Independent Albums Chart number ones
 Lists of UK R&B Albums Chart number ones
 Lists of UK Rock & Metal Albums Chart number ones

External links
Album Downloads Chart at the Official Charts Company